The 2016 NCAA Division I women's soccer season was the 35th season of NCAA championship women's college soccer. The Penn State Nittany Lions were the defending national champions.

Changes from 2015

Conference realignment

Season overview

Polls

Pre-season polls

Final polls

Major upsets

Standings

Conference winners and tournaments

See also 
 College soccer
 List of NCAA Division I women's soccer programs
 2016 in American soccer
 2016 NCAA Division I Women's Soccer Tournament
2016 NCAA Division I men's soccer season

References 

 
NCAA, Women